Kurtuluş, Mersin is the name of two villages in Mersin Province of Turkey.

Kurtuluş, Mut a village in Mut district
Kurtuluş, Silifke a village in Silifke district